Königheim is a country town in the district of Main-Tauber in Baden-Württemberg in Germany. It consists of the villages Brehmen, Gissigheim, Königheim, and Pülfringen.

The oldest historic relic is a Celtic Viereckschanze or Nemeton.

References

Main-Tauber-Kreis
Historic Jewish communities